Mervyn Davies Smith (25 December 1924 – 18 October 1977) was an Australian rules footballer who played with Fitzroy in the Victorian Football League (VFL).

Notes

External links 

1924 births
Australian rules footballers from Victoria (Australia)
Fitzroy Football Club players
1977 deaths